Al Hazm Club Stadium is a multi-use stadium in Ar Rass, Saudi Arabia.  It is currently used mostly for football matches.

References

Football venues in Saudi Arabia
Al-Hazm FC